Mouresi is a village and a former municipality in Magnesia, Thessaly, Greece. It is situated in the northeastern part of the Pelion peninsula. Since the 2011 local government reform it is part of the municipality Zagora-Mouresi, of which it is a municipal unit. The municipal unit has an area of 54.214 km2. The seat of the municipality was in Tsagkarada. In 2011 the population of the village Mouresi was 485, that of the community Mouresi was 548, and of the municipal unit 2,475.

Subdivisions
The municipal unit Mouresi is subdivided into the following communities (constituent villages in brackets):
Agios Dimitrios Piliou (Agios Dimitrios, Agios Ioannis)
Anilio (Anilio, Plaka)
Kissos
Mouresi (Mouresi, Agios Ioannis, Damouchari)
Tsagkarada (Tsagkarada, Mylopotamos)
Xorychti (Xorychti, Kato Xorychti)

Geography
The municipal unit Mouresi covers the northeastern part of the Pelion peninsula, and is situated on the eastern side of the Pelion mountains, on the Aegean Sea coast. The area is mountainous and densely forested. The largest village is Tsagkarada (population 525 in 2011). The village Mouresi lies at 310 m elevation, 1.5 km northwest of Tsagkarada, 2 km southeast of Agios Dimitrios and 7 km southeast of Zagora.

Historical population

References

External links
 
Mouresi Municipality
Mouresi (municipal unit) on GTP Travel Pages 
Mouresi (village) on GTP Travel Pages 
Mouresi on Pelion.org

Populated places in Pelion